Four Nations may refer to the following articles:

Sport
Events named the Four Nations or Four Nations Tournament:

Association football
 Four-Nations Tournament (1944), a friendly tournament hosted by Curaçao
 Four Nations Tournament (1979–2008), a former semi-professional association football tournament in Europe
 Four Nations Tournament (women's football), hosted by China since 1998
 Nations Cup (football) or 4 Associations Tournament, a men's football competition in the British Isles
 Four Nations Tournament (1988), a one-off men's football event in West Berlin
 Four Nations Tournament (China), a former men's football tournament in China
 Under-20 Four Nations Tournament in men's football, a European U20s competition
 2008 Swaziland Four Nations Tournament in men's football, an African invitational event
 2018 Four Nations Tournament, between Angola, South Africa, Zambia and Zimbabwe
 2021 Four Nations Football Tournament is a friendly football tournament between Bangladesh, Maldives, Seychelles and Sri Lanka.

Rugby union
 The Rugby Championship in the Southern hemisphere, first held in 2012; successor to the Tri Nations
 Home Nations Championship (1883–1909 and 1932–39) in Britain and Ireland; now the Six Nations Championship
 Four Nations Tournament (rugby union), played in 2006 between second-tier European teams

Other sports
 Rugby League Four Nations, with Australia, England, New Zealand and a fourth team
 4 Nations Cup in women's ice hockey tournament, held between four major national teams
 Four Nations Chess League in the UK, including players from elsewhere
 Four Nations Tournament (handball) International friendly handball tournament held yearly in Brazil
 4 Nations Netball Cup

Science fiction
 The Four Nations Alliance in the science fiction novel Crest of the Stars by Hiroyuki Morioka

See also

 Tri Nations (disambiguation)